Ghost master or ghostmaster may refer to:
 Ghost Master, a 2003 puzzle strategy video game
 Ghostmaster, the host of a midnight ghost show
 Ghostmaster, a comic book character and adversary of Manhunter in comic books published by Quality Comics
 The Ghostmaster, a character in the American animated television series The Real Ghostbusters